Nicki Lynn Aycox (May 26, 1975 – November 16, 2022) was an American actress and musician, known for her roles in Supernatural, Cold Case, Jeepers Creepers 2, Perfect Stranger and The X-Files: I Want to Believe.  She released her debut EP, Red Velvet Room, in 2015.

Early life
Aycox was born in Hennessey, Oklahoma. She had Native American ancestry and a younger brother, Steve. As a child, Aycox enjoyed singing and playing the piano.

Career
Aycox's early acting appearances included 3rd Rock from the Sun, USA High, Boy Meets World, The X-Files and a recurring role in Providence.

In 2003, Aycox played Minxie Hayes, a psychic cheerleader, in Jeepers Creepers 2. It was the sequel to the 2001 horror film Jeepers Creepers. From July to October 2005, Aycox portrayed Private Brenda "Mrs. B" Mitchell on Over There. The series followed a unit of the United States Army's 3rd Infantry Division on its first tour of duty in occupied Iraq, and chronicled the war's effects on the soldiers' families in the United States.

In 2006, Aycox guest starred in Criminal Minds as Amber Canardo, a sociopathic serial killer, in the episode "The Perfect Storm". Also that year, she portrayed Meg Masters, a recurring antagonist, in the first season of the WB (now CW) series Supernatural. Executive producer Kim Manners had previously worked with Aycox in an episode of Over There that he directed, and hand-selected her for the role of Meg.

In 2007, Aycox appeared in the thriller film Perfect Stranger, alongside Halle Berry and Bruce Willis, as a woman trying to blackmail a wealthy advertising executive. The following year, Aycox was in The X-Files: I Want to Believe, the second feature film installment of The X-Files franchise. Filming began in December 2007 and finished on March 11, 2008. In the same year, Aycox starred in Joy Ride 2: Dead Ahead, the sequel to 2001's Joy Ride.

In July 2009, Aycox began to portray the character Jaimie Allen (an undercover LAPD police officer) in the TNT action/drama series Dark Blue. It ended its run on September 15, 2010. Her final acting role was in the 2014 film Dead on Campus.

In 2015, Aycox released her debut EP, Red Velvet Room, which contained five songs of her own original music.

Personal life
Aycox was married to Matt Raab. In a March 2021 Instagram post, Aycox revealed that she had been diagnosed with leukemia.

Aycox died on November 16, 2022, at the age of 47. The cause of death was leukemia. Tributes were paid by Supernatural creator Eric Kripke, and by actors on the show, including Jim Beaver, Mark Pellegrino, Rachel Miner and Richard Speight Jr.

Filmography

Film

Television

Discography
	
Extended plays
	
 Red Velvet Room (2015)

References

External links
 
 Interview for Jeepers Creepers 2

1975 births
2022 deaths 
Deaths from leukemia
20th-century American actresses
21st-century American actresses
Actresses from Oklahoma
American film actresses
American people of Native American descent
American television actresses
People from Kingfisher County, Oklahoma